HMS Dauntless was a  light cruiser of the Royal Navy. She was built by Palmers Shipbuilding and Iron Company of Jarrow, launched on 10 April 1918 and commissioned on 22 November 1918.

Design
The class also had larger low revolution propellers for greater efficiency. Dauntless herself was completed with a large hangar under her bridge, which was eventually removed in 1920.

Interwar service

Completed too late to see action in the First World War, in 1919 she was assigned to operate in the Baltic Sea against the Bolshevik revolutionaries in Russia.  She was then on detached service in the West Indies.  Following this assignment she was attached to the 1st Light Cruiser Squadron of the Atlantic Fleet for the following five years. Dauntless was a member of the Cruise of the Special Service Squadron, also known as the 'Empire Cruise', of 1923/24. Following this tour, she went with the squadron to the Mediterranean for the next few years.

In May 1928 Dauntless was recommissioned and assigned to the America and West Indies Station, based at the Royal Naval Dockyard in the Imperial fortress colony of Bermuda. She was abandoned by most of her 462 crew, the officers remaining on board. Subsequently all of her guns and torpedo tubes and much of her other equipment had to be removed to lighten her. She was finally refloated on 11 July 1928 and towed off by her sister ship  and a number of tugs. She was repaired throughout 1929 and was reduced to the reserve.

In 1930 she was transferred back to the America and West Indies Station. During 1931-1933 she served with the South American Division (of the America and West Indies Station), and in 1934 she relieved the cruiser  in the Mediterranean and was reassigned to the 3rd Cruiser Squadron. In 1935 she returned to Britain to be paid off into the reserve.

Wartime career
On the outbreak of the Second World War, Dauntless was recommissioned and joined the 9th Cruiser Squadron with the South Atlantic Command. In December, the squadron, including Dauntless, was transferred to the China Station, and in March 1940 Dauntless operated as a unit of the British Malaya Force while in the Indian Ocean. She operated mainly off Batavia, keeping watch on German merchant ships in the Dutch East Indies harbours.

In February 1942 Dauntless returned to Britain, and underwent a refit at Portsmouth. Following this, she was transferred to the Eastern Fleet, and in November was docked in the Selborne dry dock at Simonstown, South Africa, until January 1943. She was then used as a training ship, and in February 1945 was again reduced to the reserve.

She was sold to be broken up for scrap on 13 February 1946, and in April that year was broken up at the yards of Thos. W. Ward, of Inverkeithing.

References

Publications

External links

Ships of the Danae-class
HMS Dauntless 1930–1932 at www.battleships-cruisers.co.uk
HMS Dauntless arrives in Portsmouth after repairs. Newsreel from Pathé News, 1929
  OldWeather.org transcription of ship's logbooks January to December 1919

 

1918 ships
Danae-class cruisers of the Royal Navy
Ships built on the River Tyne
World War II cruisers of the United Kingdom
Maritime incidents in 1928